Dina Salústio (born 1941) is a novelist from Cabo Verde, who is the first woman from the country to publish a novel, and the first writer from the country to have a novel translated to English.

Biography 
Dina Salústio is the pseudonym of Bernardina Oliveira, who was born in 1941 in Santo Antão. After training as a social worker, she worked for the Ministry of Foreign Affairs. She has also worked in Portugal and Angola as a journalist, social worker and teacher.

A prominent literary activist in Cabo Verde, she co-founded the Associação Escritores Cabo-Verdianos, as well as two magazines, Mudjer and Ponto e Vírgula. Her novel A Louca de Serrano was the first novel to be published by a Cabo Verdean woman. Its translation, The Madwoman of Serrano by Jethro Soutar, is the first English translation of a novel from Cabo Verde.

Awards 
In 2020 the English translation of A Louca de Serrano was short-listed for The Oxford-Weidenfeld Translation Prize. In 2016 she was presented with a Rosalía de Castro Award for lifetime achievement by PEN Galicia (es). In 1994 she was awarded the national prize for children's literature.

Reception 
Salústio's works, both creative and non-fiction, address issues relating to women's rights and Cabo Verdean society and centring female perspectives. Her works are considered an important contribution to postcolonial literature of Cabo Verde. She is also viewed as a writer who counters the masculine perspectives that can be prevalent in African literature.

Selected works

Novels 

 A Louca de Serrano (The Madwoman of Serrano), 1998
 Filhas do Vento (Daughters of the Wind), 2009
 Veromar (See-the-sea), 2019

Short stories 

 Mornas eram as noites (Warm were the Nights), 1994
 Filhos de Deus (God's Children), 2018

Non-fiction 

 Violência contra as mulheres (Violence Against Women), 1994

References 

Cape Verdean women writers
Living people
1941 births
Cape Verdean women short story writers
Cape Verdean women poets
Social workers